Peter David (September 7, 1951 – May 10, 2012) was the Washington bureau chief and primary U.S. political correspondent for The Economist, the U.K.-based weekly magazine, with which he worked for his last 28 years. He supervised coverage of the Persian Gulf War in the early 1990s and became the magazine's foreign editor from 2002 to 2009, covering the War in Afghanistan and the Iraq War. David also previously authored the "Bagehot" column on British politics, before finally moving to the U.S. to author the "Lexington" column on American politics.

Early years
Peter David was born in Johannesburg, South Africa to a family of Lithuanian Jews who had settled in South Africa decades earlier to escape pogroms. His father was a lawyer and his mother was a left-wing political activist who fought against the apartheid government. After the Sharpeville massacre there in 1960, where 69 people were killed by police, she feared arrest and the family relocated to London within days. They eventually settled in Liverpool.

After graduating from the University of London in 1972, where he studied sociology, he took jobs as a journalist for various magazines, among those were journals covering house plants and UFOs.

Career
David became the Washington bureau chief for Nature, the world's most cited journal on science. In 1984 he then joined The Economist as a science writer. He soon became the magazine's "main authority" on the Middle East while also writing the Bagehot column covering British politics and running its business sections. Later, he became its foreign editor for international topics, acting as "editorial manager and senior writer."

According to his friend Clive Crook, senior editor of The Atlantic, "he was respected for his knowledge. As a boss he was known for his kindness and generosity, as a writer for his wit, even-handedness and unaffected elegance," noting that "David was a superb journalist, one of the best The Economist ever hired. His range was stunning"

An editorial in The Economist describes his columns as models "of mind-clearing prose," noting that "his forte was to stride fearlessly across minefields of ideas." Despite the partisanship displayed in American politics, especially before elections, he remained optimistic about the country's future, referring to such partisan politics as a "binary illusion."

Crook summarizes some of David's personal traits:

For the last three years before his death, he was the magazine's Washington bureau chief covering U.S. politics and authored the "prestigious" Lexington column. The Economist describes his contributions:

Death
He died in a car accident while he and his wife were being driven back to their hotel after a speaking engagement with the Charlottesville Committee on Foreign Relations. His was the only fatality, caused by the car being rear-ended on Virginia's Interstate 64. The driver responsible for the crash was sentenced to a year imprisonment for manslaughter. He is survived by his wife of 34 years, Celia Binns, and two children, Ian David and Tessa David. He also has a sister and brother.

Notes

1951 births
2012 deaths
Alumni of the University of London
People from Johannesburg
British Jews
South African Jews
South African people of Lithuanian-Jewish descent
British male journalists
The Economist people
Road incident deaths in Virginia